Saint Pauls Mountain is a high, steeply-cliffed mountain two nautical miles (3.7 km) northeast of Round Mountain on the north side of Taylor Glacier. It is joined to Round Mountain by a high ridge. It was named by the Discovery expedition of 1901–04.

Mountains of Victoria Land
McMurdo Dry Valleys